The Golden Web is a 1920 British silent mystery film directed by Geoffrey Malins and starring Milton Rosmer and Ena Beaumont. It is based on the 1910 novel The Golden Web by the British writer E. Phillips Oppenheim, later adapted into a 1926 American film of the same title.

Cast
 Milton Rosmer as Sterling Deans
 Ena Beaumont as Winifred Rowan
 Victor Robson as Sinclair
 Nina Munro as Rosalie

References

Bibliography
 Goble, Alan. The Complete Index to Literary Sources in Film. Walter de Gruyter, 1999.
 Low, Rachael. The History of the British Film 1918-1929. George Allen & Unwin, 1971.
Wlaschin, Ken. Silent Mystery and Detective Movies: A Comprehensive Filmography. McFarland, 2009.

External links
 

1920 films
British drama films
British silent feature films
Films directed by Geoffrey Malins
1920 drama films
Films set in London
Films based on British novels
1920s English-language films
1920s British films
Silent drama films